Crepis paludosa, the marsh hawk's-beard, is a European species of flowering plant in the tribe Cichorieae of the family Asteraceae. It is widespread across much of Europe with isolated populations in Iceland, the Ural Mountains, and the Caucasus.

This herbaceous perennial is found beside shady streams and in other damp shady places. The upper leaves clasp the stem with pair of rounded basal lobes. It is a much more robust plant than smooth hawksbeard, Crepis capillaris, with which it is sometimes confused. The Flower heads are yellow and the flower buds are covered with black gland-hairs.

Conservation
Crepis paludosa is a component of Purple moor grass and rush pastures, a type of Biodiversity Action Plan habitat in the UK. It occurs on poorly drained neutral and acidic soils of the lowlands and upland fringe. It is found in the South West of England, especially in Devon.

References

External links
Irish Wildflowers
Cxech Botany in Czech with photos
Tela Botanica in French with photos and French distribution map

paludosa
Flora of Europe
Flora of Russia
Flora of the Caucasus
Plants described in 1753
Taxa named by Carl Linnaeus